"We Wait and We Wonder" is the third and final single performed by English drummer, singer-songwriter, record producer, and actor Phil Collins from his 1993 album Both Sides. It did not launch the album to the similar heights his previous efforts had achieved. It enjoyed similar success to the previous singles from the album, reaching number 45 on the UK Singles Chart, but failing to chart on the US Billboard Hot 100. It was his last single before the lead single of his next album Dance into the Light in 1996.

The B-side varied. It was either "Take Me with You", "For a Friend", "Hero", Or Stevies Blues's "There's a Place for Us" (Instrumental). "Hero" itself originally appeared on David Crosby's album Thousand Roads, with Phil singing backing vocals. The version from the "We Wait and We Wonder" single is a demo featuring only Collins on vocal.

History
The early 1990s saw a high scale of terrorism witnessed within Britain, inspiring Collins to write about how someone lives under such circumstances.

"To the outsider it seems that we in Britain live daily under the cloud of terrorism. That familiarity sometimes makes you think of it as almost normal, then suddenly something will happen..." - Sleeve note from the album.

In the press kit for the album, Collins explained that the song was an attack on both sides of the Irish Troubles - the terrorists and the government - for not being able to find a resolution, and that it was specifically inspired by the Warrington bombings.  "It's just asking, 'What does it take to work this out?'  How much further are we going to let it escalate?  I don't pretend to have the answers.  But when I see a mother and two children blown to bits by a bomb, I think this just can't go on....It's an emotional song, as much as a political one.  I look at it as a simple sentiment from an ordinary person, an angry statement.  I write these songs not in a bid to change things, because I don't really believe that I can change things to that extent, but it's really just to say 'This bothers me - does it bother anyone else?'''"

As well as being performed during the entirety of the 1994–1995 tour promoting the album, "We Wait and We Wonder" was also performed as an encore/extra song during the 2005 leg of the First Final Farewell Tour.

Critical reception
Troy J. Augusto from Cash Box wrote, "Collins’ latest Atlantic collection, Both Sides'', may be near the bottom of the album chart these days, but that doesn’t mean that the record is devoid of any good music. As proof, look no further than “We Wait & We Wonder”, just released as the title’s third single. This one ranks as one of Phil’s best efforts, both from a songwriting point of view—the solid arrangement and crafty hook will result in summer-long airplay for the song—and a delivery standpoint, as Collins comes through with all the drama and passion that have made his greatest songs so memorable. And the big, Sears-sponsored tour starts soon."

Music video
The accompanying music video featured Collins and touring band members performing the song on the Both Sides stage set-up. The song is shortened down from the album length. The second song on the album, "Can't Turn Back the Years" featured the same set and idea for its video but did not receive an official single release.

Track listing

UK 1st Version
"We Wait and We Wonder" – 5:48
"Take Me with You" – 5:24
"Stevies Blues" ("There's a Place for Us" Instrumental) – 6:49
This version is very rare.

UK 2nd Version
"We Wait and We Wonder" – 7:00
"For a Friend" – 6:04
"Hero" (Demo) – 4:45

Credits 
 Phil Collins – vocals, keyboards, guitars, bass, drums, percussion, bagpipes

Charts

Notes

1994 singles
Phil Collins songs
Song recordings produced by Phil Collins
1993 songs
Songs written by Phil Collins
Atlantic Records singles